Roseanne Park (born 11 February 1997), known mononymously as Rosé, is a Korean-New Zealand singer and dancer based in South Korea. Born in New Zealand and raised in Australia, Rosé signed with South Korean label YG Entertainment following a successful audition in 2012 and trained for four years before debuting as a member of the girl group Blackpink in August 2016.

In March 2021, Rosé made her solo debut with her single album R. The album sold 448,089 copies in its first week, the highest for a Korean female soloist. Its lead single "On the Ground" was a commercial success, peaking in the top five domestically and becoming the highest-charting song by a Korean female soloist on the US Billboard Hot 100. It was the first song by a Korean solo artist to top the Billboard Global 200 and earned Rosé two Guinness World Records. The album's second single "Gone" peaked in the top ten in South Korea as well.

Life and career

1997–2012: Early life
Roseanne Park (Park Chae-young) was born on 11 February 1997 in Auckland, New Zealand, to South Korean immigrant parents. She has an older sister. In 2004, at the age of seven, Rosé and her family moved to Melbourne, Australia. She began singing and learned to play guitar and piano as a child and performed in church choirs. She attended Kew East Primary School, and Canterbury Girls' Secondary College but dropped out before Year 11, after signing with South Korean record label YG Entertainment.

2012–2015: Pre-debut 
In 2012, Rosé attended an audition in Sydney, Australia for YG Entertainment (whose label's music she already liked) at her father's suggestion, she finished first among the 700 participants. She had initially presumed her father's idea was a joke due to the distance and difficulty of becoming a singer overseas, and "she didn't think that there was much of a chance [...] to become a K-pop star [herself]." Two months later, she had signed with the label as a trainee, and moved to Seoul, South Korea.

The same year, Rosé was given an opportunity to feature on labelmate G-Dragon's song "Without You" from his extended play (EP) One of a Kind (2012). Her name was not publicised at the time of release, her credit revealed only following her announcement as a member of Blackpink. The song peaked at number ten on South Korea's Gaon Music Chart and at number 15 on the Billboard Korea K-pop Hot 100.

2016–present: Debut with Blackpink and R 

Rosé trained at YG Entertainment for four years before she was revealed as the final member of the girl group Blackpink on 22 June 2016. The group debuted on 8 August 2016 with the single album Square One, which featured the singles "Whistle" and "Boombayah".

Rosé appeared on a variety of broadcast programs, such as King of Masked Singer. Her vocal performance on the show was met with warm reception by the audience, to which Rosé commented that she "didn't know if the audience would like [her] singing" and that she felt "happy and relieved" at the positive result. She later appeared as a performer on the second season of Fantastic Duo. The show's production staff stated that her appearance was intended to "reveal Rosé's vocal appeal, which is different from Blackpink".

On 1 June 2020, it was announced that Rosé would debut as a solo artist following the release of Blackpink's first Korean language full-length album. On 30 December 2020, in an interview with South Korean media outlet Osen, her label revealed that filming for her debut music video would begin in mid-January 2021. On 26 January 2021, a promotional teaser of Rosé's solo debut was released, revealing that a preview of her solo debut would be revealed through Blackpink Livestream Concert: The Show on 31 January 2021.

Rosé's debut single album, titled R, was released on 12 March 2021. With 41.6 million views in 24 hours of the music video for the lead single "On the Ground", she broke the almost eight-year record held by former labelmate Psy's "Gentleman" for the most viewed music video by a Korean soloist in 24 hours. "On the Ground" peaked at number 70 on the Billboard Hot 100, becoming the highest-charting song by a Korean female soloist in the US. The song also debuted and peaked at number one on both the Global 200 and Global Excl. U.S. charts, the first song by a Korean solo artist to do so. R also set the record for the highest first-week sales by a Korean female soloist, with 448,089 copies sold. On 24 March, Rosé received her first-ever music show win as a soloist with her single "On the Ground" on South Korean cable music program Show Champion and would go on to win five more. On 5 April, the music video for Rosé's song "Gone" was released. 

"Hard to Love", a pop-disco solo sung by Rosé, is featured as the fifth track of Blackpink's second studio album Born Pink, which was released on 16 September 2022.

Artistry

Influences and voice 
In a radio interview, Rosé cited labelmate Taeyang of Big Bang as a role model in her musical career. She also named American singer Tori Kelly as an inspiration towards her musical style. Since her debut with Blackpink, Rosé's voice has received acknowledgement in the K-pop industry for its distinct vocal timbre and is nicknamed "the golden voice" amongst fans. Following Rosé's performance on Fantastic Duo 2, South Korean singer Gummy, whom Rosé cited as a musical role model, complimented Rosé's voice for being "so unique" and describing it as "the [type of] voice young people love".

Other ventures

Fashion and endorsements 
In 2018, Rosé and fellow Blackpink member Jisoo were selected as endorsement models for the Korean cosmetics brand Kiss Me. In October 2019, Rosé was revealed as a promotional model for the Perfect World Entertainment's MMORPG Perfect World Mobile. In August 2021, Rosé became a model for Korean unisex casual brand 5252 BY OIOI and contemporary brand OIOICOLLECTION. In December 2021, she announced her collaboration with the mediation and sleep app Calm, featuring her own bedtime story titled "Grounded With Rosé". In February 2022, alongside actor Yeo Jin-goo, Rosé was selected as one of the models for Korean retail store Homeplus for the brand's 25th anniversary promotions. In August 2022, Rosé became a model for skincare brand Sulwhasoo's #SulwhasooRebloom campaign.

In July 2020, Rosé was named the global ambassador for Yves Saint Laurent by creative director Anthony Vaccarello, its first global ambassador in 59 years. She was the global face of Saint Laurent's Fall 2020 campaign. In January 2021, Rosé became the muse for luxury cosmetics brand Yves Saint Laurent Beauté. In September 2021, Rosé attended the Met Gala, a fundraising event held annually at the Metropolitan Museum of Art Costume Institute in New York City, as Vaccarello's guest. As a result, she, alongside rapper CL, became the first female K-pop idols to attend the event.

In April 2021, Rosé became Tiffany & Co's global ambassador and starred in its 2021 Tiffany HardWear digital campaign. She stated, "I’ve always loved wearing Tiffany jewelry. To be part of an iconic brand that has been part of my life for a long time makes it that much more special to me. I am very honored and excited to be a part of the HardWear campaign and I can't wait for everyone to see it." In March 2022, Rosé became the face of 2022 Tiffany HardWear campaign. She was photographed by Mario Sorrenti wearing a new necklace, bracelet, and full pavé diamond pieces.

Philanthropy 
During the 2019–20 Australian bushfire season, Rosé posted on Instagram urging fans to support relief efforts, providing links to organizations that accepted donations and explaining, "We can make a difference if we all join in. Please help to save my home country".

Impact and influence 
As of April 2021, Rosé is among the top 10 most-followed Korean individuals on Instagram, with over 37 million followers. Since 2018, she has appeared on the Korean Business Research Institute's female celebrity brand reputation list, a chart that tracks Korean celebrities with the most online searches and engagements, and previously reached the top 10. Rosé helped the Yves Saint Laurent's Women's Summer 21 collection showcase earn 27.3 million views on YouTube, 11 million views on Instagram and Facebook, and 30.6 million views on Weibo in one day. The video of Saint Laurent's 2021 Spring/Summer collection reached 100 million views after Rosé was featured in the video. Rosé's impact extends to other artists in the music industry as well. On February 10, 2023, she released a cover of Stephen Sanchez's "Until I Found You" in honor of her birthday. The cover peaked at number one on Billboards Hot Trending Songs chart, and the original version concurrently rose 8% in U.S. streams during the same week.

Discography

Single albums

Singles

Other charted songs

Composition credits 
All song credits are adapted from the Korea Music Copyright Association's database, unless otherwise noted.

Videography

Music videos

Filmography

Television shows

Awards and nominations

Listicles

World records

Notes

References

External links 

 
 
 

1997 births
Living people
Musicians from Melbourne
Blackpink members
New Zealand emigrants to Australia
Japanese-language singers of South Korea
English-language singers from South Korea
New Zealand people of South Korean descent
K-pop singers
21st-century South Korean women singers
New Zealand expatriates in South Korea
YG Entertainment artists
South Korean female idols
Dance-pop musicians
People educated at Canterbury Girls' Secondary College